Joseph Bilodeau (August 9, 1900 – October 25, 1976) was a Canadian politician and a one-term Member of the Legislative Assembly of Quebec.

Background

He was born on August 9, 1900 in Saint-Pamphile, Chaudière-Appalaches and became an attorney.

Political career

Bilodeau ran as a Union Nationale candidate in the 1936 election in the provincial district of L'Islet and defeated Liberal incumbent and Premier Adélard Godbout.  He was appointed to Premier Maurice Duplessis's Cabinet in 1936.  He served as Minister of Municipal Affairs and Minister of Industry and Trade.  He was defeated in the 1939 and 1944 elections.

Death

Bilodeau died on October 25, 1976.

References

1900 births
1976 deaths
Union Nationale (Quebec) MNAs
19th-century Canadian politicians